TOFOP (an acronym of Thirty Odd Foot Of Podcast) is a weekly Australian comedy podcast created and hosted by Wil Anderson and Charlie Clausen, and launched in July 2010. Episodes are roughly an hour in length, and primarily consists of casual conversations between Anderson and Clausen on a variety of recurring themes, including; film, popular culture, and sport. Common features are humorous personal anecdotes, and detailed discussions on bizarre hypothetical situations. Significant media coverage in June 2012 helped TOFOP rise to become the most popular comedy podcast in Australia.

The podcast has over 50,000 followers in 70 countries mostly in Australia and the USA. Anderson and Clausen have made occasional appearances on episodes of TOFOP's "sister podcast," American comedy podcast Walking the Room. This relationship contributed greatly to the podcast's American popularity.

During Episode 83 of TOFOP, released on 9 September 2012, the projected long-term hiatus of the podcast was announced. Clausen and Anderson were deliberately vague in detailing the reasons for TOFOP's hiatus, other than the fact that a particular company employing Clausen had objected to the content of the podcast. In January 2013 the hiatus was revealed to have been requested by the Seven Network after Clausen had received a starring role as Zac MacGuire in popular Australian soap opera Home and Away. The show returned in February 2013 under the name FOFOP, a reference to a previous episode and the television show Fringe. However, due to contractual obligations the show returned without Clausen, and instead with Anderson and one or more guests, nicknamed "guest-Charlies".

On 1 June 2014 Clausen returned to TOFOP in Episode 84, after almost 2 years. Each episode of the podcast averages 20,000 downloads.

In 2017, TOFOP joined the podcasting network, Planet Broadcasting.

Guest appearances
Despite the fact that TOFOP was usually recorded with only Anderson and Clausen present, several episodes also featured guests, including Australian comedians Michael Chamberlin, Justin Hamilton and Tom Ballard. Walking the Room hosts Greg Behrendt and Dave Anthony appeared on several episodes of the podcast, and also collaborated with Anderson and Clausen during the 2012 Melbourne International Comedy Festival, in a live podcast recording dubbed "Super Pod".

Since Episode 52, the podcast introduction featured prominent Australian voice-over artist John Deeks performing a parody of advisory content warnings commonly heard on Australian television.

List of TOFOP episodes

References

External links
 
 TOFOP on Liberated Syndication
 TOFOP on iTunes
 Wil Anderson website

Comedy and humor podcasts
All Things Comedy
Audio podcasts
2010 podcast debuts
Australian podcasts